The Nun's Night is a 1967 Czechoslovak film directed by Karel Kachyňa adapted from a novel by Jan Procházka. Set in a Moravian village in the early 1950s, a time of collectivisation as well as mass closures of monasteries and convents by the Stalinist regime, the film is an evocative critique of religious fanaticism and political ideology.

Cast
Jana Brejchová as Nun
Mnislav Hofmann as Chairman Picin
Gustáv Valach as Village idiot Ambrož
Josef Kemr as Priest
Josef Elsner as Farmer Jan Šabatka
Čestmír Řanda as Farmer Alois Skovajs
Jaroslav Moučka as Farmer Vitásek
Josef Větrovec as Farmer Josef Bařina
Valerie Kaplanová as Filipa, Picin's wife
Libuše Havelková as Farmer Klára Jedličková

References

External links
 

1967 films
Czechoslovak drama films
1960s Czech-language films
Czech black-and-white films
1960s Czech films